Son of the Nile ( translit. Ibn El Nil)  is a 1951 Egyptian drama film directed by Youssef Chahine. It starred Yehia Chahine, Faten Hamama, Mahmoud el-Meliguy, and Shukry Sarhan and was chosen as one of the best 150 Egyptian film productions in 1996, during the Egyptian Cinema centennial. The film received an award from the New Delhi International Film Festival and was nominated for the Prix International award at the 1952 Cannes Film Festival and an award in the Venice International Film Festival.

Plot 
Hemaidah (shokry sarhan) is a farmer who hates country life. He hates working in fields and taking care of the animals in his farm. Though unsatisfied with her, he marries Zebeidah (Faten Hamama), a woman in the same village. He is determined to leave the village, move and live in the city. He plans for his travel and asks his brother to look after his farm and family. In Cairo, Hemaidah falls in the hands of a gang, headed by a ruthless gangster. Not wishing to risk his life, he is forced to work with the gang and help them in their crimes. He is introduced to theft and harlotry, and one day the police arrest the gang. Hemaidah spends his time in prison and returns to his village after his release, regretting that he had left it.

Cast 
Shukry Sarhan as Hemaidah
Faten Hamama as Zebeidah
Yehia Chahine as Hemaidah's brother, Ibrahim
Mahmoud El-Meliguy as the gang boss
Nader Galal as Hemaidah's son

See also 
 The Nile and the Life
 Those People of the Nile
 Lists of Egyptian films

References 

 website , abn alnayl 's official site. Retrieved on January 4, 2021.

External links 
 

1951 films
1950s Arabic-language films
1951 drama films
Films directed by Youssef Chahine
Egyptian drama films
Egyptian black-and-white films